Nichizō (日像, 1269–1342) was one of Nichirō's nine senior disciples (not to be confused with the six senior disciples of Nichiren). He was responsible for giving Nichiren Buddhism official imperial recognition in 1321. He was exiled twice while attempting to achieve this goal.

External links 
 https://web.archive.org/web/20100612233710/http://nichirenscoffeehouse.net/Ryuei/HokkeShu_01.html

1269 births
1342 deaths
Japanese Buddhist clergy
Nichiren Buddhism
Nichiren-shū Buddhist monks
Kamakura period Buddhist clergy